The following is the list of international reactions to the 2021 Israel–Palestine crisis.

International organisations

National

UN member and observer states

Other states

Protests 

 On 9 May, the Muslim Association of Britain organised protests in London, Manchester, Birmingham, and Bradford, in opposition to the potential evictions.
 On 10 May, thousands of Jordanians protested outside the Israeli embassy in Amman.
 On 10 May, thousands of Turks, Syrians, and Palestinians protested outside the Israeli consulate in Istanbul. Protesters gathered in Turkey despite the complete closure due to COVID-19, with Palestinian and Turkish flags in their hands, "Turkish army go to Gaza!" shouted slogans in the form.
 On 11 May, hundreds of South Africans held a pro-Palestinian protest in Cape Town.
 On 11 May, hundreds of protesters held a pro-Palestinian protest in Brighton. 
 Pro-Israel and pro-Palestine protesters in Manhattan clashed on 11 May.
 A pro-Palestinian demonstration was held on Constitution Avenue in Washington, D.C. on the afternoon of 11 May.
 The Council on American-Islamic Relations (CAIR) and American Muslims for Palestine organised a pro-Palestinian protest outside the State Department in Washington, D.C. on 11 May. The protest was attended by Representatives Rashida Tlaib and André Carson.
 A British campaign, "Friends of Al-Aqsa", sent at least 45,000 emails to members of parliament, which organizer Ismail Patel said he was "overwhelmed" by and said "demonstrates that the leaders of Britain's main political parties, who have largely kept quiet on the crisis in Jerusalem's Al-Aqsa Mosque and Sheikh Jarrah neighbourhood, are out of touch with public opinion".
 On 15 May, thousands of people attended rallies across Ireland, in Cork, Galway and Dublin, including outside the Israeli Embassy, in support of Palestine.

Social media 
Instagram and Twitter users who had written in support of the Palestinians said their posts had been deleted or their accounts had been suspended. The companies apologized and blamed the situation on a technical glitch.
A video circulated on social media showing Israelis celebrating at the Western Wall, whilst a tree in the background, at the Al-Aqsa Mosque, was on fire. A large crowd of Israeli Jews gathered around a fire near the mosque on 10 May, chanting yimakh shemam. IfNotNow co-founder Simone Zimmerman criticized them as exhibiting "genocidal animus towards Palestinians — emboldened and unfiltered". The Intercept described the video as "unsettling" and an example of "ultranationalist frenzy". Ayman Odeh, an MK for the Joint List said the video was "shocking". Journalist David Patrikarakos described the video as an example of "fake news", on the grounds that singing and dancing are a part of annual Jerusalem Day celebrations and that the fire was started by Palestinian protesters throwing firecrackers.
Twitter restricted the account of Palestinian-American journalist Mariam Barghouti, who was reporting on the protests from the West Bank. Barghouti said Twitter asked her to delete some of her tweets. The company later said the account restriction was due to an error.
Israeli actress Gal Gadot tweeted a statement, which received mixed reactions on Twitter.
Barbadian singer Rihanna released a statement, asking for protection of both Israeli and Palestinian children, to which she received mixed responses on Twitter.
American model Bella Hadid streamed herself participating in a pro-Palestine march on Instagram Live, in which she chanted "From the river to the sea, Palestine will be free". The official Israel Twitter account publicly condemned this, posting a screencap of her stream and claiming she advocated for "throwing Jews into the sea".
Bill Maher defended Israel on his talk show, stating Jews were native inhabitants of that land. He criticized the placement of Palestinian military posts in the middle of civil areas. He also criticized Bella Hadid and reminded her that Palestinian authorities had just passed a rule requiring women to ask their male guardians for authorization to travel.

Airlines 
On May 12, American Airlines, United Airlines, and Delta Air Lines suspended their flights to Israel.

Notes

References 

2021 in international relations
Palestine crisis
2021 in the Gaza Strip
2021 in the State of Palestine
2021 protests
2021 riots